A234 or A-234 may refer to:

 A234 road, England
 A234 highway (Nigeria)
 A-234 (nerve agent), a Novichok agent
 ASTM A234, an ASTM International standard for steel

See also
 Article 234 of the Treaty Establishing the European Community
 234, a year